Daniel Afriyie Barnieh (born 26 June 2001) is a Ghanaian professional footballer who plays as an attacking midfielder or a forward for Swiss Super League club Zürich.

Early life 
Born in the Ashanti Region of Ghana, Afriyie is an Akan by birth and descent. He attended Dunyan Nkwanta JHS in the Ahafo Ano South district, Mankranso in Ashanti Region and later proceeded to Aduman Senior High School in Aduman for his secondary school education. He admired Brazilian striker Ronaldo and idolizes Sergio Agüero who he considers as his idol.

Club career

Early career 
Afriyie featured for a number of colts (juvenile) clubs in the Ashanti Region where he ascended to a cult hero status. He began at Amansie FC before joining Celtic Academy in Kumasi then moved to colts club Valencia in 2015.

He moved a step further in his career by moving to the Ghana Division Two League with Galaxy United where he featured from 2016 to 2017. In January 2018, Afriyie joined Burkina Faso top flight side Rahimo FC where helped the club to win the Burkinabé Premier League in the 2018–19 Burkinabé Premier League season and secure qualification to the 2019–20 CAF Champions League. He made a return to Ghana and joined Thunder Bolt also in the Ghana Division Two League and played for a short stint before securing a move to Madina Republicans in the same league in 2019. In December 2019, Afriyie was given a four-week trial at Kumasi Asante Kotoko. He failed to impress during the trials after being played out of position as an out and out striker but found it difficult to communicate it to the coach with fear of being dropped.

Hearts of Oak 
The following month after being dropped by Kotoko, Afriyie was given another chance to play for a Ghana Premier League side after he was offered as part of negotiations between Hearts of Oak and Abdul Aziz Nurudeen who he shared the same agent with. He was given the opportunity to trial and be observed by the head coach. Fortunately for him, he impressed the technical staff and on 15 January 2020 he was signed on a three-year deal ahead of the 2019–20 Ghana Premier League. He made his debut on 19 January 2020 in a 2–1 away win against Liberty Professionals.

FC Zürich 
On 3 January 2023, Afriyie officially joined Swiss side Zürich for an undisclosed fee, signing a contract until June 2026 with the club. The player's registration was set to be completed after his participation in the 2022 African Nations Championship with the Ghana A' national team.

International career 
In October 2019, Afriyie received a call up into Ghana national under-23 preliminary squad ahead of the 2019 U-23 Africa Cup of Nations, though reports were that he put on an impressive showdown, he missed out on the final squad.

In August 2020, he was named on the Ghana national under-20 preliminary squad for the 2020 WAFU Zone B U-20 Tournament, which also served as the qualifiers for the Africa U-20 Cup of Nations. He made the final squad and was appointed as the captain of the side. He led Ghana to win the trophy and qualify for the 2021 Africa U-20 Cup of Nations. In the final, he inspired the team by scoring the equalizer via a free-kick from Percious Boah in the 21st minute to trigger a comeback over their neighbours Burkina Faso in the final. Boah later scored the final goal to seal the victory.

Afriyie made the squad for the 2021 Africa U-20 Cup of Nations and again led Ghana to win the tournament for the first time in 12 years, since winning in 2009. On 6 March, during the final, he scored a brace, one in each half to lead Ghana to a 2–0 victory and emerge as the African U-20 Champions for the 4th time in the country's history. The game coincided with Ghana's 64th Independence Day celebration which drew in more excitement after the victory. Afriyie was ultimately adjudged the man of the match of the final.

On 3 August 2021, after an impressive season with Hearts of Oak, Afriyie received his debut call up to the Ghana A' (Black Galaxies) under the management of Annor Walker for a camping exercise ahead of their upcoming international assignments including 2022 CHAN qualifiers and 2021 WAFU Nations Cup.  A week later, under the management of C.K. Akunnor, Afriyie was handed his first call-up into the Ghana senior team, the Black Stars, ahead of Ghana's  2022 Qatar FIFA World Cup Group G qualifiers against Ethiopia and South Africa. He was one of the five home-based players to make the squad.

Personal life 
In 2021, after Afriyie helped Hearts to win the 2020–21 Ghana Premier League, his manager Abdul Malik Ibrahim (board director of Pacific Oil GH) presented him with a brand new 2013 Hyundai Veloster.

Career statistics

Club

International 

 Scores and results list Ghana's goal tally first, score column indicates score after each Afriyie goal.

Honours 

Rahimo
 Burkinabé Premier League: 2018–19

Hearts of Oak
 Ghana Premier League: 2020–21
Ghanaian FA Cup: 2021 2022
Ghana Super Cup: 2021  
 President's Cup: 2022

Ghana U20
 Africa U-20 Cup of Nations: 2021
WAFU Zone B U-20 Tournament: 2020
Individual

 SWAG Home-based Footballer of the Year: 2021, 2022
 Ghanaian FA Cup Top scorer: 2021
Ghanaian FA Cup Player of the Year: 2022

References

External links 
 
 

Living people
2001 births
Ghanaian footballers
Association football forwards
Ghana youth international footballers
Rahimo FC players
Accra Hearts of Oak S.C. players
FC Zürich players
Ghana Premier League players
Swiss Super League players
Ghanaian expatriate footballers
Expatriate footballers in Burkina Faso
Ghanaian expatriate sportspeople in Burkina Faso
Expatriate footballers in Switzerland
Ghanaian expatriate sportspeople in Switzerland
2022 FIFA World Cup players
Ghana A' international footballers
2022 African Nations Championship players